Mike Van Diest is an American football coach. He is the defensive coordinator at Montana State University–Northern, a position he has held since 2021. Van Diest served as the head football coach at Carroll College in Helena, Montana from 1999 to 2018, compiling a record of 203–54. Van Diest's Carroll Fighting Saints won six NAIA National Championships, four consecutively from 2002 to 2005, a fifth in 2007, and a sixth in 2010.

Head coaching record

See also
 List of college football coaches with 200 wins
 List of college football coaches with a .750 winning percentage

References

External links
 Carroll profile

Year of birth missing (living people)
Living people
Carroll Fighting Saints football coaches
UMass Minutemen football coaches
Montana Grizzlies football coaches
Northwestern Wildcats football coaches
Wyoming Cowboys football coaches
Wyoming Cowboys football players
Sportspeople from Helena, Montana